Kavanagh or Kavanaugh may refer to:

People 

 Kavanagh (surname), including a list of persons with the name
Justice Kavanagh (disambiguation)
 Brett Kavanaugh, an associate justice of the Supreme Court of the United States

Arts, entertainment and media
 Kavanagh (novel), an 1849 novel by Henry Wadsworth Longfellow
 Kavanagh QC, a 1995–2001 British television series
 "Kavanaugh" (The Shield), a 2006 episode of the television series The Shield

Places
 Kavanagh, Alberta, a hamlet in Canada
 Kavanagh, Iran, a village in Iran
 Kavanagh Building, an Art Deco skyscraper in Buenos Aires, Argentina
 Kavanagh College, a secondary school in Dunedin, New Zealand
 Kavanaugh Field, was a minor league baseball park in Little Rock, Arkansas

See also
 Caomhánach (Gaelic language spelling of the name), a surname
 Cavanagh (disambiguation)